Swartzia nuda is a species of flowering plant in the family Fabaceae. It is found only in Panama. It is threatened by habitat loss.

References

nuda
Flora of Panama
Endangered plants
Taxonomy articles created by Polbot